Cyperus filipes is a species of sedge that is native to parts of New South Wales in eastern Australia.

See also 
 List of Cyperus species

References 

filipes
Plants described in 1878
Taxa named by George Bentham
Flora of New South Wales